Eiker, Modum og Sigdal District Court is a district court located in Hokksund, Norway.  It covers the municipalities of Krødsherad, Modum, Nedre Eiker, Sigdal and Øvre Eiker and is subordinate Borgarting Court of Appeal.

References

External links 
Official site 

Defunct district courts of Norway
Organisations based in Hokksund